Monroe Lawrence Flinn (December 17, 1917 – November 29, 2005) was an American politician.

Born in Batesville, Arkansas, Flinn moved with his family to Cahokia, Illinois in 1956. He worked for the Granite City Steel Company as a consultant. He was a member of the St. Clair County Board. Flinn served in the Illinois House of Representatives from 1971 to 1995 and was a Democrat. Flinn then served as chair of the Illinois Merit Commission until his death. Flinn died in Cahokia, Illinois.

Notes

External links

1917 births
2005 deaths
People from Batesville, Arkansas
People from Cahokia, Illinois
Businesspeople from Illinois
Democratic Party members of the Illinois House of Representatives
County board members in Illinois
20th-century American politicians
20th-century American businesspeople